Natalya Fedoskina (born 15 June 1980) is a Russian race walker.

Achievements

External links

1980 births
Living people
Russian female racewalkers
21st-century Russian women